Aurel Krause (December 30, 1848 – March 14, 1908) was a German geographer known today for his early ethnography of the Tlingit Indians of southeast Alaska, published in 1885.

Krause was born in Polnisch Konopath near Schwetz, West Prussia. He and his brother Arthur Krause were employed by the Geographical Society of Bremen in Germany when they conducted ethnological research in Siberia, followed by Aurel Krause's mostly solo research with the Tlingit of Klukwan, Alaska, in 1881 and 1882. 

Krause died in 1908 in Groß-Lichterfelde.

Krause Mountain, located 16 miles west-southwest of Haines, Alaska, is named after the Krause brothers. It is a part of the Takhinsha Mountains.

Bibliography

Krause, Aurel (1956). The Tlingit Indians: Results of a Trip to the Northwest Coast of America and the Bering Straits.  (Original title: Die Tlinkit-Indianer.)  Trans. by Erna Gunther.  Seattle: University of Washington Press.
Krause, Aurel and Krause, Arthur (1984). To the Chukchi Peninsula and to the Tlingit Indians 1881/1882. Trans. By Dietrich Reimer Verlag.
Krause, Aurel (1981). Journey to the Tlingits. Trans. By Margot Krause McCaffrey. Haines Centennial Commission.

References

External links

German geographers
German ethnographers
German naturalists
People from Świecie County
People from West Prussia
1848 births
1908 deaths
19th-century geographers
19th-century naturalists
19th-century German scientists
19th-century anthropologists